Dr. John de Sequeyra (b. 1712 London, d. 1795 Williamsburg, Virginia) was born into a Spanish-Portuguese Jewish family whose ancestors were once court physicians to the Kings and Queens of Spain and Portugal.  He was the middle son of Dr. Abraham de Sequeira (1665-1747) who was a member of Bevis Marks Synagogue in London.

Medical career

He studied medicine in Holland beginning in 1736 and received his degree in 1739 from the University of Leiden.  In Holland he was known as "Johannes de Sigueyra" and "Iohannes Disiqueyra" .

In 1745, he moved to Williamsburg, Virginia where he practiced medicine.  Between 1745 and 1781 he compiled a manuscript entitled "Diseases in Virginia." He was a physician who attended about 85 households during a smallpox epidemic of 1747/8.

In 1769, Colonel George Washington, as he was known then, frequently called in Dr. Sequeyra to treat his stepdaughter "Patsy,"  daughter of Martha Park Custis.  Patsy suffered from increasingly debilitating epileptic seizures which eventually led to her death.

In 1773, the first insane asylum in the 13 colonies, Eastern State Hospital was built in Williamsburg, Virginia, and it remains in operation to this day.  Dr. John de Sequeyra was one of the first physicians attached to the facility.  So accomplished in caring for the residents, was Dr. Sequeyra, that when he retired in 1795 it took two doctors to back-fill his position.

Tomatoes

John Hill once wrote – "Those who are us'd to eat with the Portuguese Jews know the value of it"; he was speaking of the tomato.  John Custis IV, a Williamsburg resident, sent a letter to Peter Collinson, in 1741, inquiring about this thing called a "tomato".  Tomatoes made their way to Colonial America by way of the West Indies Slave Trade – it was a staple food of the slaves who learned to discern the poisonous varieties from the edible varieties.

Thomas Jefferson himself informs us that introduction of the tomato as an edible fruit is due to the work of Dr. John de Sequeyra.

Notes and references

Jewish-American history
American Sephardic Jews
1710s births
Medical doctors from London
English emigrants
1719 deaths
English expatriates in the Netherlands
Spanish and Portuguese Jews
People from Williamsburg, Virginia
18th-century American physicians